Optical fiber, nonconductive, riser (OFNR) is a type of optical fiber cable.
As designated by the National Fire Protection Association (NFPA), this name is used for interior fiber-optic cables which contain no electrically conductive components, and which are certified for use in riser applications; they are engineered to prevent the spread of fire from floor to floor in a building.  Typically they are tested for compliance with ANSI/UL 1666–1997, Standard Test for Flame Propagation Height of Electrical and Optical-Fiber Cable Installed Vertically in Shafts.  NFPA NEC 2005 Art 770.51(B) FPN.  

They are distinct from optical fiber, nonconductive, plenum cable (OFNP), and general-purpose optical cable.

Related abbreviations

Underwriters Laboratories defines the following related abbreviations:

OFC: Optical fiber, conductive
OFN: Optical fiber, nonconductive
OFCG: Optical fiber, conductive, general use
OFNG: Optical fiber, nonconductive, general use
OFCP: Optical fiber, conductive, plenum
OFNP: Optical fiber, nonconductive, plenum
OFCR: Optical fiber, conductive, riser
OFNR: Optical fiber, nonconductive, riser

References

Optical fiber